Mesophleps geodes is a moth of the family Gelechiidae. It is found in South Africa (KwaZulu-Natal), Malawi, Kenya, Pakistan and India.

The wingspan is 10.5–18.5 mm. The forewings are uniformly dark brown, without markings.

The larvae feed on Acacia brevispica, Acacia catechu, Acacia farnesiana and Albizia lebbeck. They live in the seed pods.

References

Moths described in 1929
Mesophleps
Moths of Asia